James Clinton ( – 24 January 1718) sired the American branch of the prominent Clinton family including 4th Vice President of the United States George Clinton and Revolutionary War Major General James Clinton.

According to Clinton family lore, James Clinton was an Anglo-Irish soldier and politician. Clinton’s name does not appear to be extant in contemporary political papers, or contemporary military documents, and the details of possible military and political careers thus far remain a mystery.

Early life
Clinton was born circa 1667 in Ireland.  He was the son of Elizabeth (née Kennedy) Clinton and William Clinton (1614–1684), who is said to have been a royalist officer in the army of Charles I of England (A corresponding army commission for a William Clinton has yet to be located.)

James’ father is alleged to have been a nephew of Thomas Clinton, 3rd Earl of Lincoln and a grandson of Henry Clinton, 2nd Earl of Lincoln How this family relationship has been deduced is unclear. It was not mentioned by either Charles, George, or Dewitt Clinton; and no William has been identified in the corresponding generation of the family of the Earls of Lincoln who fits the dates attributed to William Clinton, father of James.

After the king's death in 1649, James’ father William went into exile on the Continent for a time before going to Scotland, possibly in support of the heir to the throne, Charles II.  While in Scotland he married his mother, Elizabeth Kennedy.  His parents subsequently moved to the northern part of Ireland where they had one son, James.

Legacy
James Clinton is reported to have made an unsuccessful attempt to recover his patrimonial estates in England. The location of these estates in England, and the date of Clinton’s suit, is unknown, as no corroborating documents have so far been identified. While there he is said to have married Elizabeth Smith, (d. 1728) the daughter of a New Model Army captain under Cromwell. James returned to Ireland, where he and his wife had three children, two daughters and a son:

 Christiana Clinton (1685–1776), who married John Beatty (1645–1729).
 Mary Clinton
 Charles Clinton (1690–1773), who married Elizabeth Denniston (1703–1775) and had seven children.

In May 1729, his then forty-year-old son Charles left Dublin and emigrated to New Ulster (now Ulster County in New York, United States) in a vessel called the George and Anne. Charles had paid for the passage of 94 people aboard the ship.

Descendants
Through his daughter Christiana, he was the grandfather of the Rev. Charles Clinton Beatty (1715–1772) and the great-grandfather of Dr. John Beatty (1749–1826), who served as a Continental Congressman as well as the Speaker of the New Jersey General Assembly, Secretary of State of New Jersey, and a U.S. Representative from New Jersey.

Through his only son Charles, he was the grandfather of seven, including Revolutionary War Major General James Clinton (1736-1812) and New York Governor George Clinton (1739-1812), who served as the 4th Vice President of the United States.

References
Notes

Sources

1667 births
1718 deaths
Roundheads
Clinton family of New York